Susan Nan Stevenson is an American diplomat and career member of the Senior Foreign Service who has served as Principal Deputy Assistant Secretary in the Bureau of Intelligence and Research since 2021. She previously served as the United States ambassador to Equatorial Guinea from 2019 to 2021.

Early life and education

Stevenson earned both a Bachelor of Science and a Bachelor of Arts in multinational management and French from the Wharton School of the University of Pennsylvania. She speaks Mandarin Chinese, French, Spanish, and Thai.

Career 

Early in her career Stevenson worked in product management for the Kellogg Company, including as Category Brand Manager for Children's Cereal, Kellogg's Produits Alimentaires in France.

Stevenson joined the Foreign Service in 1992. Her international assignments have included Beijing, Hong Kong, Mexico City and Bangkok. She served as the assistant press officer for e-media at the United States Embassy Bangkok from 1994 to 1997, assistant cultural officer for economic affairs at the United States Embassy Mexico City from 1998 to 2000, spokesperson and press officer at the United States Consulate General Hong Kong from 2002 to 2006, and spokesperson for the United States Embassy Beijing from 2006 to 2010. She assumed her post as United States Consul General in Chiang Mai, Thailand, from 2010 to 2012. Stevenson served the State Department in senior positions for the Under Secretary of State for Public Diplomacy from 2014 to 2016 and in the Bureaus of East Asian and Pacific Affairs as Deputy Assistant Secretary (for Public Diplomacy) from 2012 to 2014.  She then served as Principal Deputy Assistant Secretary in the State Department's Bureau of Public Affairs. 

Stevenson was nominated by President Donald Trump on September 13, 2018, and was confirmed as ambassador to the Republic of Equatorial Guinea on January 2, 2019. She left her post in September 2021.

Stevenson joined the Bureau of Intelligence and Research as the Principal Deputy Assistant Secretary in October 2021.

Personal life
Stevenson speaks Mandarin Chinese, French, Spanish, and Thai.

See also
List of ambassadors appointed by Donald Trump

References

External links

Date of birth missing (living people)
Year of birth missing (living people)
Living people
Wharton School of the University of Pennsylvania alumni
United States Foreign Service personnel
Ambassadors of the United States to Equatorial Guinea
21st-century American diplomats
American women ambassadors
21st-century American women
American women diplomats